The Chapelle Saint-Jean-Baptiste de Jaucourt is a chapel dedicated to St John the Baptist in the commune of Jaucourt in the Aube département of France. It is the last remnant of the former castle.

Description
On a rectangular plan measuring 5.4 by 10 metres, its Romanesque doorway has a trefoil tympanum.

History
The chapel dates from the last quarter of the 12th century and the 13th century. It has been listed since 1994 as a monument historique by the French Ministry of Culture.

See also
List of castles in France

References

External links
 

Monuments historiques of Grand Est
Castles in Grand Est
Churches in Aube